is a former Japanese soccer player.

Club statistics

References

External links

1982 births
Living people
Hannan University alumni
Association football people from Okayama Prefecture
Japanese footballers
J1 League players
J2 League players
J3 League players
Ventforet Kofu players
Kataller Toyama players
Association football midfielders